Uherské Hradiště is a town in the Zlín Region of the Czech Republic. It has about 24,000 inhabitants. The agglomeration with the two neighbouring towns of Staré Město and Kunovice has over 36,000 inhabitants.

The town is the centre of Moravian Slovakia. The historic town centre is well preserved and is protected by law as an urban monument zone.

Administrative parts
Town parts and villages of Jarošov, Mařatice, Míkovice, Rybárny, Sady and Vésky are administrative parts of Uherské Hradiště.

Etymology
The name can be literally translated as "Hungarian Gord", meaning "a fortified settlement near the Hungarian border".

Geography
It lies on the left bank of the Morava River, which forms the northern border of the municipal territory. A small river of Olšava flows through the southern part of the territory.

The western part of Uherské Hradiště is located in the Lower Morava Valley and the eastern part in the Vizovice Highlands.

History

A predecessor of Uherské Hradiště was a settlement and fortification system on three island in the Morava River, founded by Slavic tribes in the early 9th century. The settlement disappeared after the fall of the Great Moravian Empire.

The town of was founded in 1257 by King Ottokar II of Bohemia to protect the nearby monastery in Velehrad. It was originally named Nový Velehrad ("New Velehrad") and then Hradiště. In 1587, the name Uherské Hradiště was used for the first time.

In the 14th century, stone walls were built and replaced the original wooden palisades. In the following centuries, the fortification system has been continuously improved. Due to its location, Uherské Hradiště repeatedly faced raids. The town was threatened by the Cumans in the 16th century, by military clashes during the Thirty Years' War, or by Turkish invasions during the Austro-Turkish War (1716–1718). The town was not conquered until 1742 by the Prussian Army.

From 1644 to 1773, the Jesuits acted in the town. Their work increased the cultural and spiritual life of the town. The order founded complex of buildings which included Jesuit college, Church of Saint Francis Xavier and Jesuit school.

In the 1780s, Uherské Hradiště ceased to function as a fortress. In the mid-19th century, the town began to expand beyond the walls. Construction growth continued in the late 19th century when representative building were constructed, and in the early 20th century when industrial companies were founded.

Uherské Hradiště was hit by the 1997 Central European flood.

Demographics

Transport

The Uherské Hradiště agglomeration is served by 8 urban bus lines (numbered 2–9), as well as more regional and long-distance routes.

Uherské Hradiště is situated on the railway of transregional and international importance. It lies on the Prague – Olomouc – Luhačovice line, Brno – Staré Město line, Brno – Břeclav – Olomouc line, and international line from Poland and Ostrava to Slovakia and Hungary. The local line to Uherský Brod is also served by Vésky railway stop.

The town is not served by a freeway or expressway, but is crossed from west to east by road I/50, which forms part of European route E50.

Culture
Uherské Hradiště is the centre of the cultural region of Moravian Slovakia, which is known for its characteristic folklore, music, costumes, traditions and production of wine.

Uherské Hradiště is known for its film festival named Summer Film School (Letní filmová škola).

Education

The Uherské Hradiště Gymnasium, founded 16 September 1884, is the oldest Czech-speaking grammar school in the region of Moravian Slovakia.

Sport
The town is home to a football club 1. FC Slovácko, which plays in the Czech First League at the Městský fotbalový stadion Miroslava Valenty. The town also has an ice rink with a capacity of 1,500 visitors, which is home to HC Uherské Hradiště playing the 2nd Czech ice hockey league.

Sights

The main part of the Baroque Jesuit complex is the Church of Saint Francis Xavier from 1670–1685. It is the landmark of the Masarykovo Square, the main town square. The adjacent former Jesuit college from 1654–1662 houses today the tourist information centre, the gallery of Joža Uprka, and an exposition on history of the town. The former Jesuit school from 1700–1737, today known as Reduta, is used for cultural and social purposes. The former Jesuit garden is now a town park.

The Franciscan monastery was founded in 1491. The building was not compelely finished until the early 18th century, when the baroque reconstructions were also made. The monastery is a significant monument of transregional importance with valuable interiors. Construction of the adjacent Church of Annunciation of the Virgin Mary also began in the early 16th century, but was finished after 1605.

Moravian Slovakia Museum is one of the most popular ethnographic museums in Moravia. It was founded in 1895. The side wall of the museum building is decorated by a mosaic allegory of the seasons by Jano Köhler from 1905. The building is a cultural monument. The museum also manages the Moravian Slovakia Museum's Gallery. The gallery seats in the Baroque building of a former armory from 1721–1723.

The synagogue was built in 1875. In 1904, it was rebuilt and the neo-Romanesque façade was added. It was burned down in 1944 and reconstructed after the World War II. Nowadays, the former synagogue serves as a library.

Uherské Hradiště railway station won the Building of the Year award after its reconstruction in 2004, and in 2011 was chosen as the "most beautiful Czech railway station".

Notable people

Adolf Jellinek (1821–1893), rabbi
Ernst Sträussler (1872–1959), neuropathologist
Božena Benešová (1873–1936), novelist and poet
Jindřich Prucha (1886–1914), painter
Anton Gala (1891–1977), Slovak ophthalmologist; studied here
Jan Antonín Baťa (1898–1965), businessman
Otakar Borůvka (1899–1995), mathematician, studied here
Zdeněk Chalabala (1899–1962), conductor
Věra Suková (1931–1982), tennis player
Paul Speckmann (born 1963), American singer and musician; lives here
Petr Nečas (born 1964), politician and former Prime Minister
Ladislav Kohn (born 1975), ice hockey player
Radim Bičánek (born 1975), ice hockey player
Tatana Sterba (born 1976), Swiss DJ
Michal Tabara (born 1979), tennis player

Twin towns – sister cities

Uherské Hradiště is twinned with:
 Bridgwater, England, United Kingdom
 Krosno, Poland
 Mayen, Germany
 Sárvár, Hungary
 Skalica, Slovakia

References

External links

 
Populated places in Uherské Hradiště District
Cities and towns in the Czech Republic
Moravian Slovakia
Shtetls